Roy Schultz is a Canadian retired ice hockey goaltender who was an All-American for Wisconsin.

Career
Schultz played several seasons with the Swift Current Broncos  of the Saskatchewan Junior Hockey League. He helped the team finish with winning records each season and was retained by the team as an over-age player in 1978. After exhausting his junior eligibility, Schultz was recruited to Wisconsin by Bob Johnson and shared starting duties with Julian Baretta as a freshman. After Baretta's graduation, Schultz took over as the primary goaltender in 1980. Unfortunately, the Badgers weren't very good that season. Wisconsin finished 9th in the WCHA, missing the postseason for the only time under Johnson's tutelage. Schultz, however, was well regarded by the league and named as the conference's top goaltender that season. He was also named as an All-American despite possessing rather poor statistical numbers.

After his sophomore season, Schultz was signed to a professional contract by the Boston Bruins, a fairly rare occurrence at the time, and began playing minor hockey that spring. On December 10, 1980, Schultz was called up to Boston to serve as an emergency backup while normal reserve Jim Craig attended his uncle's funeral. He didn't play in the game and was returned to Springfield afterwards. He bounced around several minor league teams over the succeeding few seasons before retiring in 1983.

Statistics

Regular season and playoffs

Awards and honors

References

External links

1957 births
Living people
AHCA Division I men's ice hockey All-Americans
Ice hockey people from Saskatchewan
Canadian ice hockey goaltenders
Wisconsin Badgers men's ice hockey players
Binghamton Dusters players
Springfield Indians players
Saginaw Gears players
Salem Raiders players